High Voltage (foaled 1952 in Kentucky) was a Thoroughbred racehorse who was the American Champion Two-Year-Old Filly of 1954. 

Bred and raced by Gladys Mills Phipps' Wheatley Stable, High Voltage was conditioned for racing by U.S. Racing Hall of Fame trainer Sunny Jim Fitzsimmons. En route to her two-year-old Championship, High Voltage won five stakes races, including the Matron Stakes, in which she defeated Lalun.

At age three, High Voltage won five more stakes races, notably taking the 1955 Acorn Stakes and again defeating Lalun in winning the Coaching Club American Oaks.  In spite of her strong performances in 1955, High Voltage finished behind stablemate Misty Morn in the balloting for American Champion Three-Year-Old Filly honors.

Broodmare 
Retired to broodmare duty, High Voltage was bred to the very best stallions in the United States. She produced five foals by Wheatley Stable's Bold Ruler as well as one with their Bold Lad. Two of her foals were sired by Princequillo, one by Ribot, and another by Court Martial. Her progeny met with modest success in racing, but a stakes-winning son, Bold Commander, by Bold Ruler, set a Laurel Park Racecourse for 8.5 furlongs and went on to sire 1970 Kentucky Derby winner Dust Commander. High Voltage died in 1968.

Pedigree

References

 High Voltage's pedigree and partial racing stats

1952 racehorse births
1968 racehorse deaths
Racehorses bred in Kentucky
Racehorses trained in the United States
American Champion racehorses
Thoroughbred family 8-c
Byerley Turk sire line